Kraka, or UC2 Kraka was an amateur-built midget submarine completed in 2005, the first diesel–electric amateur sub in Denmark. It was built by Peter Madsen, Claus Nørregaard and several other people. The propulsion was diesel–electric with a 16 hp diesel engine and an 8 hp electric motor. Kraka can be seen at Denmark's Technical Museum in Elsinore (aka Helsingør).
Kraka is named after a woman in Norse mythology known for her intelligence.

Construction
The sub was built at Peter Madsen's workshop in Farum, Denmark. Construction took  years and over 3600 hours to build. It was built with two engines, a diesel and an electric, making the sub a diesel-electric. With a diesel drive, this theoretically allows the sub to have a  range, and up to  submerged. It has a 40kW Volvo Penta MD 19 diesel and a 6kW Sauer Danfoss 24V DC electric motor. The marine diesel engine was 65 years old when it launched in 2005. Backing the electric is 24V 400Ah Sectronic-Fram GS gel battery. UC2 has two sets of balance tanks, two main tanks and two trim tanks. With its flooding system, it takes only 20 seconds to reach neutral buoyancy. At the bottom of the sub is a dive lock, allowing emergency escape while submerged. The lock also allows use by divers while submerged. Unlike predecessor Freya, Kraka is equipped with an air compressor allowing for extended dive times. UC2 cost about 200,000 DKK to build. The sub can hold 4 people.

History
Construction started in 2002 and finished in 2005, when it was launched and put out to sea for voyages. At the time it was finished, it was one of only three diesel submarines in private civilian hands in the world, and one of only seven civil private sea-going submarines in the world.

After decommissioning, it was put on display, at Demark's Technical Museum in Helsingor.

References

Midget submarines
2005 ships
Individual watercraft
Peter Madsen